The Unionist Party of Northern Ireland was a political party founded by Brian Faulkner in September 1974.

Formation
The party emerged following splits in the Ulster Unionist Party in 1973 and 1974 over the British government's white paper Northern Ireland Constitutional Proposals, the 1973 Northern Ireland Assembly election, and the Sunningdale Agreement. Faulkner had led the majority of the UUP into a power-sharing coalition but in January 1974 he was deposed as leader as the anti-Sunningdale faction of the party won control. In the February 1974 general election a number of Faulkner's followers (including several sitting MPs) stood as Pro-Assembly Unionists against a coalition of the Ulster Unionist Party, the Vanguard Progressive Unionist Party and the Democratic Unionist Party. They failed to win a single seat at Westminster, and this defeat contributed to the downfall of the power-sharing Executive established by Sunningdale. However they remained active and in September constituted themselves as the Unionist Party of Northern Ireland, committed to a return to power-sharing as a settlement for Northern Ireland.

Electoral history
The party did not prosper. In the October 1974 general election they again failed to make much ground. The weakness of Faulkner's position within Unionism was reflected in the fact that only about a dozen of the approximately 250 local councillors elected for the UUP in 1973 chose to join the new party. The 1975 elections to the Northern Ireland Constitutional Convention were another blow to the party. Of 13 UPNI candidates elected as UUP members in 1973, only five succeeded in holding their seats, compared to 47 seats won by other Unionist candidates. The five UPNI members included Faulkner who suffered a personal setback in his South Down constituency. He finished in 7th place with 6,000 first preference votes in an area where he had topped the poll with 16,000 votes just two years earlier. Consequently the influence of both the UPNI and Faulkner waned.

In 1976 Faulkner stepped down as leader of the party (and withdrew from active politics) and was succeeded by Anne Dickson, the first woman to lead a political party in Northern Ireland. However the party continued to make little ground. In 1977 UPNI won just six local council seats. The 1979 Westminster election proved to be a further disappointment, as the main consequence of the party standing seemed to be to split the centre vote. In North Belfast, Dickson's 4,000 votes were greater than the DUP majority of 1,000 over the UUP. Similarly in East Belfast the DUP finished 64 votes ahead of the UUP and 900 ahead of the Alliance party with Norman Agnew taking 2,000 votes for UPNI.

In 1981 the party admitted the weakness of its own position during the local government election campaign and that power-sharing on the 1973 model was no longer a viable option. The party fought the 1981 local elections in an electoral pact with the Ulster Popular Unionist Party but only won two seats. As a result in autumn 1981 the UPNI was formally dissolved. William Bailie, their last remaining councillor, joined the Alliance Party and was re-elected as an Alliance councillor in North Down.

Leadership
Faulkner himself died in a riding accident in 1977. Anne Dickson replaced him as leader of the party. However, the party had poor showings at the 1977 local elections and also the 1979 general election. The party was dissolved soon afterwards.

Election results

February 1974 general election

October 1974 general election

1979 general election

References

Defunct political parties in Northern Ireland
History of Northern Ireland
Political parties established in 1974
Political parties disestablished in 1981
Ulster unionist organisations
1974 establishments in Northern Ireland
1981 disestablishments in Northern Ireland